Murdock is a surname. A relatively modern iteration of the Irish or Scottish name Murdoch. Notable people with the surname include:

 Andrew Murdock, American record producer
 Andrew G. Murdock, botanist whose official abbreviation is "Murdock", who described the fern genus Ptisana
 Bennet Murdock (1925–2022), American psychologist
 Colin Murdock (born 1975), Northern Irish former footballer
 Dorothy M. Murdock, better known by pen name Acharya S, author and proponent of the Christ myth theory
 David H. Murdock, American businessman
 Deroy Murdock, American syndicated columnist
 Eric Murdock, retired American professional basketball player
 George Peter Murdock, American anthropologist known for his empirical approach to ethnological studies
 George Murdock, American actor
 Ian Murdock, founder and former leader of the Debian Linux Distribution
 James Murdock (disambiguation), various people
 Joseph Murdock (disambiguation), various people
 Kirk Radomski (known to players as Murdock), former New York Mets employee
 Mike Murdock, American televangelist and pastor
 Murdock, Portuguese professional footballer
 Orrice Abram Murdock, Jr., United States Representative and Senator from Utah
 Roger E. Murdock, LAPD Chief
 Sharon Murdock, Canadian politician
 Shirley Murdock, American R&B singer
 William Murdock, eighteenth century US politician
 William Murdoch, also spelled Murdock, early-nineteenth century Scottish engineer

Fictional characters 

 Murdock, the fictional main antagonist in Carland Cross
 Buz Murdock, fictional character from the TV series Route 66
 HM "Howling Mad" Murdock, character played by the actor Dwight Schultz in the 1980s television series The A-Team
 Roger Murdock, character from Airplane!, played by Kareem Abdul-Jabbar
 Buck Murdock, character from Airplane II: The Sequel, played by William Shatner

Marvel Comics
 Matthew Murdock, the given name of the Marvel Comics superhero Daredevil of Earth-616 and namesake of the Netflix series Daredevil
 Mike Murdock, Matt Murdock's magically-created twin brother
 Jack Murdock, Matt's and Mike's father
 Maggie Murdock, Matt's and Mike's mother
 Matthew Murdock, the given name of the Kingpin of Earth-65

See also 

 Maddock (surname)
 Murdoc
 Murdoch